Tamara Goldman Sher, Ph.D. (November 9, 1962) is a licensed clinical psychologist and professor at The Family Institute at Northwestern University. She is a leading researcher in the fields of Behavioral Medicine (Health Psychology) and Couples Therapy. Sher was awarded a $2.4 million grant from the National Heart, Lung and Blood Institute of the National Institutes of Health (NIH) which combined both of these fields in a study measuring the benefits of couples' involvement in cardiac treatment. This grant is part of Sher's work with the National Institute of Health's Behavior Change Consortium. Sher's research has been mentioned in the Chicago Tribune, Psychology Today, on Chicago Public Radio, and published in several leading psychology journals.

Biography 
Tamara Goldman Sher is a native of Chicago's suburbs who lives with her husband and two daughters in suburban Cook county. She is the sister of Abigail Helaine Goldman, Pulitzer Prize–winning journalist for the LA Times, and Josh Goldman, an entrepreneur, investor, and venture capitalist who is currently a partner at Norwest Venture Partners in Palo Alto, California.

Sher earned her PhD in clinical psychology from the University of North Carolina at Chapel Hill (1989) and B.A. from the University of Michigan (1984). After completing her internship training at Rush University Medical Center she spent seven years on medical school faculty where she became head of the health psychology track of the internship program and director of the Couples and Health program. In 1994, Dr. Sher moved to the College of Psychology at Illinois Institute of Technology (IIT), where she taught for 17 years. In 2007 she became director of clinical training for the College of Psychology. In 2011, Sher left IIT as a full professor to join The Family Institute at Northwestern University as their vice president for research.

In 2000, Sher co-authored (with K. B. Schmaling) a textbook entitled "The Psychology of Couples and Illness." She belongs to several professional societies including the American Psychological Association (APA), the Association for Behavioral and Cognitive Therapies (ABCT), and the Society of Behavioral Medicine (SBM). Sher is regularly invited as a symposium discussant and presentation author to each of these professional societies annual conferences. In addition, she is on the editorial board of the APA Journal of Family Psychology, a member of the National Institute of Health's Behavior Change Consortium, and sits on the Clinical Oversight Committee for the Cancer Wellness Center.

Research description 
The goal of Sher's NIH grant was to determine if improvement in a couple's interpersonal relationship would result in sustained changes in health behavior, improvement in the couple's quality of life, and health benefits specific to the cardiac patient. Working out of labs at both the Illinois Institute of Technology and Rush University Hospital, Sher's team recruited 160 participants (approximately 35% minorities, 30% women) in which one member suffered from a cardiovascular event (e.g., myocardial infarction, bypass graft surgery, angioplasty). Using a short term couples intervention strategy designed to optimize relationships and reduce interpersonal stress, the team focused on three areas of change: exercise, weight management, and compliance with lipid-lowering medication. These areas were targeted because of the difficulty many cardiac patients face in maintaining long-term commitments to change.

Currently, Sher is interested in applying what she has learned from previous work to a much wider population of patients through the use of the Internet and telephone. She is particularly interested in reaching patients who do not have the time or resources to participate in intensive out-patient groups.

Interviews 
BNET Sher discusses the difficulty of telling a new romantic relation about a preexisting STD
Chicago Public Radio program 848 Sher discusses her NIH funded study (date: February 14, 2001)
Chicago Tribune Sher discusses her NIH funded study for the Chicago Tribune
Psychology Today Sher discusses difficulties in doctor/patient communication based on her research findings

Selected works and publications 

Books
Osterman, G. P.; Sher, T. G.; Hales, G.; Canar, W. J.; Singla, R.; & Tilton, T. (2003). Physical Illness. In D. K. Snider & M. A. Whisman (Eds.), Treating Difficult Couples: Helping Clients with Coexisting Mental and Relationship Disorders (pp. 350–369). New York, NY: Guilford Press.
Schmaling, K.B. & Sher, T.G. (Eds.) (2000). The Psychology of Couples and Illness: Theory, research, & practice..  Washington, DC: American Psychological Association Books.
Schmaling, K.B. & Sher, T.G. (1997). Physical health and relationships. In W. K. Halford & H. J. Markman (Eds.), Clinical handbook of marriage and couples interventions (pp. 323–345). Hoboken, NJ: Wiley.
Sher, T. G. (1996). Courtship and marriage: Choosing a primary relationship. In N. Vanzetti & S. Duck (Eds.), A lifetime of relationships (pp. 243–264). Belmont, CA: Thomson Brooks/Cole Publishing.

Educational Videos
Couples and Illness with Tamara Goldman Sher, PhD

Academic Journals

External links
 National Institute of Health's Behavior Change Consortium

References

American women psychologists
21st-century American psychologists
American women academics
Illinois Institute of Technology faculty
University of Michigan College of Literature, Science, and the Arts alumni
University of North Carolina at Chapel Hill alumni
Living people
1962 births
21st-century American women
20th-century American psychologists